Dâmbovița County (also spelt Dîmbovița) is a county of Romania, in Muntenia, with the capital city at Târgoviște, the most important economic, political, administrative and cultural center of the county.

It has an area of 4,054 km (1.7% of the country's area).

Demographics 

In 2011, it had a population of 518,745 and the population density was 127/km2. It is one of the most densely populated counties in Romania.

 Romanians – 96%
 Roma (Gypsies) and others – 4%

Name
The county is named after the Dâmbovița River, which is a name of Slavic origin, derived from Дъб, dâmb, meaning "oak", as it once flowed through the oak forests of the Wallachian Plain.

Geography
Dâmbovița county has a total area of 4,054 km2.

The county's landscape has three main forms. In the north there are mountains from the Southern Carpathians group – the Bucegi Mountains and the Leaotă Mountains. In the center there are the sub-Carpathian hills and the southern area is part of the Romanian Plain.

The county's main river gives it its name: the Dâmbovița River. Also the Ialomița River flows in the county's northern and eastern regions, while the Argeș River flows in the south.

Neighbouring counties
Ilfov County and Prahova County in the East.
Argeș County in the West.
Brașov County in the North.
Teleorman County and Giurgiu County in the South.

Economy
One of the biggest steel factories in Romania is located In Târgoviște. Also, oil is extracted and refined in the county.

The predominant industries in the county are:
Metallurgical industry.
Oil extraction equipment.
Food industry.
Home appliances.
Textile industry.
Chemical industry.
Construction materials industry.

Tourism
The main tourist destinations are:
The city of Târgoviște – the ancient capital of Muntenia.
The Pucioasa Resort.
The Ialomița River Valley – Peștera Ialomicioarei.

Trivia
Glod, a small village in this area, was used to represent Kazakhstan in the filming of the mockumentary movie Borat: Cultural Learnings of America for Make Benefit Glorious Nation of Kazakhstan.

Politics 

The Dâmbovița County Council, renewed at the 2020 local elections, consists of 34 counsellors, with the following party composition:

Administrative divisions

Dâmbovița County 2 municipalities, 5 towns and 82 communes
Municipalities
Moreni
Târgoviște – county seat; population: 79,610 (as of 2011)
Towns
Fieni
Găești
Pucioasa
Răcari
Titu

Communes
Aninoasa
Băleni
Bărbulețu
Bezdead
Bilciurești
Braniștea
Brănești
Brezoaele
Buciumeni
Bucșani
Butimanu
Cândești
Ciocănești
Cobia
Cojasca
Comișani
Conțești
Corbii Mari
Cornățelu
Cornești
Costeștii din Vale
Crângurile
Crevedia
Dărmănești
Dobra
Doicești
Dragodana
Dragomirești
Finta
Glodeni
Gura Foii
Gura Ocniței
Gura Șuții
Hulubești
I. L. Caragiale
Iedera
Lucieni
Ludești
Lungulețu
Malu cu Flori
Mănești
Mătăsaru
Mogoșani
Moroeni
Morteni
Moțăieni
Niculești
Nucet
Ocnița
Odobești
Perșinari
Pietrari
Petrești
Pietroșița
Poiana
Potlogi
Produlești
Pucheni
Raciu
Răscăeți
Răzvad
Râu Alb
Runcu
Sălcioara
Slobozia Moară
Șelaru, Dâmbovița
Șotânga
Tărtășești
Tătărani
Uliești
Ulmi
Văcărești
Valea Lungă
Valea Mare
Văleni-Dâmbovița
Vârfuri
Vișina
Vișinești
Vlădeni
Voinești
Vulcana-Băi
Vulcana-Pandele

Historical county

Historically, the county was located in the central-southern part of Greater Romania, in the northern part of the historical region of Muntenia. The county included a large part of the present county. It was bordered to the west by the counties of Muscel and Argeș, to the north by Brașov County, to the east by Prahova County, and to the south by the counties of Ilfov and Vlașca.

Administration

The county was originally divided administratively into six districts (plăși):
Plasa Finta, headquartered at Finta
Plasa Găești, headquartered at Găești
Plasa Pucioasa, headquartered at Pucioasa
Plasa Târgoviște, headquartered at Târgoviște
Plasa Titu, headquartered at Titu
Plasa Voinești, headquartered at Voinești

Subsequently, the territory of the county was reorganized into eight districts by the abolition of Plasa Finta and the establishment of three new districts in its place:
Plasa Bilciurești, headquartered at Bilciurești
Plasa Bogați, headquartered at Bogați
Plasa Ghergani, headquartered at Ghergani

Population 
According to the 1930 census data, the county population was 309,676 inhabitants, ethnically divided as follows: 96.9% Romanians, 2.1% Romanies, 0.2% Jews, 0.2% Hungarians, 0.1% Germans, as well as other minorities. From the religious point of view, the population was 98.9% Eastern Orthodox, 0.3% Roman Catholic, 0.3% Jewish, 0.1% Adventist, 0.1% Greek Catholic, as well as other minorities.

Urban population 
In 1930, the county's urban population was 33,398 inhabitants, comprising 63.2% Romanians, 2.0% Jews, 1.3% Romanies, 1.2% Hungarians, 0.5% Greeks, as well as other minorities. From the religious point of view, the urban population was composed of 94.8% Eastern Orthodox, 2.1% Jewish, 1.5% Roman Catholic, 0.6% Greek Catholic, 0.3% Calvinist, 0.3% Lutheran, as well as other minorities.

References

External links

 
Counties of Romania
Place names of Slavic origin in Romania
1879 establishments in Romania
1938 disestablishments in Romania
1940 establishments in Romania
1950 disestablishments in Romania
1968 establishments in Romania
States and territories established in 1879
States and territories disestablished in 1938
States and territories established in 1940
States and territories disestablished in 1950
States and territories established in 1968